Old Post Office, or Former Post Office, may refer to:

Belgium
 Old Post Office (Ghent)

Serbia
 Old Post Office (Belgrade)

United Kingdom
 Old Post Office, Bristol
 Tintagel Old Post Office, Tintagel

United States
(ordered by state and city)
 Old Athens, Alabama Main Post Office in Athens, Alabama, listed on the National Register of Historic Places
 Old Brick Post Office in Wickenburg, Arizona, NRHP-listed
 Old Camden Post Office in Camden, Arkansas, listed on the NRHP in Arkansas
 Old Post Office (Fayetteville, Arkansas), listed on the NRHP in Arkansas
 Old Post Office (Hot Springs, Arkansas), listed on the NRHP in Arkansas
 Little Rock U.S. Post Office and Courthouse, also known as the Old Post Office and Courthouse, Little Rock, Arkansas, NRHP-listed
 Old Post Office (Mena, Arkansas), listed on the NRHP in Arkansas
 Old Post Office (Santa Rosa, California), listed on the NRHP in California
 Old Post Office Building (Washington, D.C.), District of Columbia
 Old Eau Gallie Post Office, in Eau Gallie, Florida
 Old Fort Pierce Post Office, in Fort Pierce, Florida, NRHP-listed
 Old Post Office and Customshouse (Key West, Florida), NRHP-listed
 Old U.S. Post Office and Federal Building (Macon, Georgia), listed on the NRHP in Georgia
 Old Chicago Main Post Office, Chicago, Illinois, listed on the NRHP in Illinois
 Former US Post Office Building (Fairfield, Iowa), listed on the NRHP in Iowa
 Old Post Office (Iowa City, Iowa), NRHP-listed
 Old United States Courthouse and Post Office (Frankfort, Kentucky), NRHP-listed
 Old U.S. Customshouse and Post Office and Fireproof Storage Company Warehouse, in Louisville, Kentucky, NRHP-listed
 Old Post Office (Baton Rouge, Louisiana), listed on the NRHP in Louisiana
 Old Post Office (Augusta, Maine), listed on the NRHP in Maine
 Old Post Office (Liberty, Maine), NRHP-listed
 Old Post Office Building (Brockton, Massachusetts), NRHP-listed
 Old Post Office Building (Lynn, Massachusetts), NRHP-listed
 Old US Post Office (Philadelphia, Mississippi), NRHP-listed
 Old Post Office (Omaha, Nebraska), a former building in Omaha, Nebraska
 Old Post Office (Concord, New Hampshire), listed on the NRHP in New Hampshire
 Old Post Office Block, in Manchester, New Hampshire, listed on the NRHP in New Hampshire
 Old Post Office (Albuquerque, New Mexico), NRHP-listed
 Old Clovis Post Office in Clovis, New Mexico, listed on the NRHP in New Mexico
 Old Las Vegas Post Office in Las Vegas, NM, listed on the NRHP in New Mexico
 Old Post Office (Albany, New York), NRHP-listed
 United States Post Office, Former, and Federal Courthouse (Auburn, New York), NRHP-listed
 Old Post Office (Buffalo, New York), formerly the tallest building in Buffalo, NRHP-listed
 Old Post Office (Oneonta, New York), NRHP-listed
 Former US Post Office (Belmont, North Carolina), listed on the NRHP in North Carolina
 Former US Post Office (Mount Olive, North Carolina), listed on the NRHP in North Carolina
 Former US Post Office (Smithfield, North Carolina), listed on the NRHP in North Carolina
 Former US Post Office Building (Waynesville, North Carolina), listed on the NRHP in North Carolina
Post Office (Christine, North Dakota), known also as Old Post Office, NRHP-listed, in Richland County
 Old Akron Post Office, listed on the NRHP in Akron, Ohio
 Old College Hill Post Office in Cincinnati, Ohio, NRHP-listed
 Howard M. Metzenbaum United States Courthouse, Cleveland, Ohio, NRHP-listed as "Old Federal Building and Post Office"
 United States Post Office and Courthouse (Columbus, Ohio), NRHP-listed
 Old Post Office and Federal Building (Dayton, Ohio), in Dayton, Ohio, listed on the NRHP in Ohio
 Franklin Post Office, in Franklin, Ohio, NRHP-listed as "Old Log Post Office"
 Old Central Post Office in Toledo, Ohio, listed on the NRHP in Ohio
 Old Post Office (Watertown, South Dakota), NRHP-listed as "Watertown Post Office"
 Old Post Office (Chattanooga, Tennessee), listed on the NRHP in Tennessee
 Old Post Office Building (Knoxville, Tennessee), listed on the NRHP in Tennessee
 Old U.S. Post Office and Courts Building (Jefferson, Texas), NRHP-listed
 Old Federal Building and Post Office (Victoria, Texas), National Register of Historic Places listings in Victoria County, Texas
 Old Post Office (Washington, D.C.), NRHP-listed as "Old Post Office and Clock Tower"
Old Post Office (Pullman, Washington), NRHP-listed as "U.S. Post Office-Pullman"
 Old Morgantown Post Office, part of the Monongalia Arts Center in Morgantown, West Virginia, NRHP-listed
 Old Ashland Post Office, listed on the NRHP in Ashland, Wisconsin
 Former United States Post Office (Kaukauna, Wisconsin), listed on the NRHP in Wisconsin

See also

Post office
Postal service
List of United States post offices
Federal Building and Post Office (disambiguation)
U.S. Post Office and Courthouse (disambiguation)

Postal service (disambiguation)
Post Office (disambiguation)
Old Post (disambiguation)